Athletics Center O'rena is a 4,000-seat multi-purpose arena in Auburn Hills, Michigan. It is home to the Oakland University Golden Grizzlies men's basketball, women's basketball and volleyball teams. The court has a distinctive "blacktop" color first used in the 2015–16 season.

History
The facility opened November 17, 1998, with a 96–66 loss to Michigan State University in men's basketball. The opening of the O'rena coincided with Oakland's move from Division II of the National Collegiate Athletic Association (NCAA) to Division I.

Attendance

The O'rena attendance record is 4,123, set January 13, 2017, against the University of Detroit Mercy. There have been seven other crowds over 4,000: 4,114 vs. Detroit (2015–16), 4,110 vs. Valparaiso (2015–16), 4,101 vs. Detroit (2014–15), 4,065 vs. Detroit (2013–14), 4,063 vs. Georgia (2016–17), 4,055 vs. University of Missouri (2003–04) and 4,034 vs. Oral Roberts University (2009–10).

Power Five conference opponents
Oakland has a 4–2 record all-time against Power Five conference schools at home. They have defeated Michigan (2000–01 season), Texas A&M (2003–04), Tennessee (2011–12) and Georgia (2016–17) since the arena opened in 1998.

See also
 List of NCAA Division I basketball arenas

References

College basketball venues in the United States
Oakland Golden Grizzlies
Sports venues in Oakland County, Michigan
Sports venues completed in 1998